The 1990–91 Segunda División season saw 20 teams participate in the second flight Spanish league. Albacete Bp. and Deportivo de La Coruña were promoted to Primera División. Orihuela Deportiva, Elche CF, UD Salamanca, Levante UD and Xerez CD were relegated to Segunda División B.

Teams

Final table

Results

Promotion playoff

First Leg

Second Leg

References

Segunda División seasons
2
Spain